Xiangyang Township is a township under the administration of Lingbi County, Anhui, China. , it has 12 villages under its administration.

References 

Township-level divisions of Anhui
Lingbi County